is a top-down racing video game released for the Family Computer in 1988 by Namco in Japan only. The game was developed by Masanobu Endō, who previously developed Xevious and The Tower of Druaga, and his company Game Studio.

A sequel titled Family Circuit '91 was released for the Family Computer in 1991, while a second sequel, Super Family Circuit was released for the Super Famicom in 1994.

Reception

The game topped the bi-weekly Japanese Famitsu sales chart in February 1988.

Notes

References

1988 video games
Japan-exclusive video games
Nintendo Entertainment System games
Nintendo Entertainment System-only games
Bandai Namco Entertainment franchises
Racing video games
Video games developed in Japan